The continuing Monastery of the Holy Saviour at Lecceto in Tuscany, was the principal House of the order of the Hermit Friars of Saint Augustine (not to be confused with the Augustinian Canons Regular) in 1256, when Pope Alexander IV constituted the Augustinian order internationally.  It was dedicated to Saint Saviour.

History

On 4 May 1256 Pope Alexander IV issued a papal bull Licet ecclesiae catholicae uniting five Monastic congregations into the Tuscan community of Lecceto. The other four were the houses of St. William, of Brother John Bono, of Favale and of Brettine. From this act of union, the modern Order expanded rapidly, and it is from this act of union that Tuscany is regarded as the homeland of the modern Augustinian Friars, and Lecceto is its principal monastic house.

Lecceto became a centre of reform for the Augustinians, and developed methods of encouraging a more faithful practise of the Augustinian Rule, and the Constitutions of the Order. At its height, Lecceto was the Monastic house of four of the order's most distinguished Priors General. From the Observant Congregation of Lecceto, other like-minded groups developed over the centuries, including the Observant Congregation of Saxony where Martin Luther was professed. 

Probably the most famous member of the Lecceto community was William Flete, an Englishman. In 1359, when Flete was about to attain his Master of theology degree at Cambridge University, he had a change of heart and chose to leave England and go to Lecceto to intensify his experience of contemplation. He stayed for the remainder of his life. He became regarded by his contemporaries as a master of the spiritual life. He was a personal confidant of St. Catherine of Siena.

By 1968 of the modern era, the monastery had declined, and the roof had fallen in. In that year, the Dominican bishop of Sienna decided that he wanted to revitalise Lecceto Augustinian spirituality at Sienna. He began a project to restore it, and to invite the Augustinian contemplatives to transfer their community there. Augustinian nuns arrived back in 1972.
The re-established community of Augustinians there have revived the Augustinian tradition of contemplation. The monastery welcomes overnight guests, who are also welcome to join the nuns at the Divine Office.

Notes

Sources and external links
Order of St Augustine, International Homepage
Catholic Encyclopaedia - Hermits of St. Augustine
Augustinian Abbey of St. Thomas at Brno
Bl. Anthony Patrizzi and the Blessed of Lecceto (Augustinians of the Midwest)

Augustinian monasteries in Italy
Augustinian nunneries